HPM may refer to:

 Harbarian process modeling
 Hargeisa Provincial Museum, in Hargeisa, Somalia
 Haystack Prayer Meeting, held in Williamstown, Massachusetts, in 1806
 High-power microwave, directed-energy weapon using electromagnetic radiation
 high performance mobile, a semiconductor production type parametric variant of TSMC
 Hospice and Palliative Medicine, a medical specialty that focuses on symptom management, relief of suffering and end-of-life care 
 Human performance modeling
 Human Potential Movement, self-improvement movement of the 1960s
 Hydrogen-moderated self-regulating nuclear power module, a type of nuclear power generator
A high proper motion star
 High performance material, type of special technical plastic
 High Performance Process Manager - type of Honeywell-produced device widely used in industry to control chemical and refining processes 
 Honda Prospect Motor, an automobile manufacturing company